Gerhard Krimbacher (born 6 January 1953) is an Austrian sports shooter. He competed at the 1976 Summer Olympics and the 1984 Summer Olympics.

References

External links
 

1953 births
Living people
Austrian male sport shooters
Olympic shooters of Austria
Shooters at the 1976 Summer Olympics
Shooters at the 1984 Summer Olympics
Place of birth missing (living people)
20th-century Austrian people